Oleg Vladimirovich Krasikov (born 16 November 1999) is a Russian curler from Saint Petersburg. He has won the Russian mixed and mixed doubles curling championships.

Teams

Men's

Mixed

Mixed doubles

References

External links

Living people
Russian male curlers
Curlers from Saint Petersburg
1999 births